The 2018 WTA Awards are a series of awards given by the Women's Tennis Association to players who have achieved something remarkable during the 2018 WTA Tour.

The awards
These awards are decided by either the media, the players, the association, or the fans. Nominees were announced by the WTA's Twitter account and on the WTA official website.

Note: award winners in bold

Player of the Year
 Simona Halep
 Angelique Kerber
 Petra Kvitová
 Naomi Osaka
 Caroline Wozniacki

Doubles Team of the Year
 CoCo Vandeweghe &  Ashleigh Barty
 Barbora Krejčíková &  Kateřina Siniaková
 Elise Mertens &  Demi Schuurs
 Tímea Babos &  Kristina Mladenovic

Most Improved Player of the Year
 Kiki Bertens
 Julia Görges
 Daria Kasatkina
 Elise Mertens
 Wang Qiang
 Aliaksandra Sasnovich

Newcomer of the Year
 Amanda Anisimova
 Danielle Collins
 Mihaela Buzărnescu
 Sofia Kenin
 Aryna Sabalenka

Comeback Player of the Year
 Belinda Bencic
 Bethanie Mattek-Sands
 Ajla Tomljanović
 Serena Williams

Karen Krantzcke Sportsmanship Award
 Petra Kvitová

Peachy Kellmeyer Player Service Award
 Bethanie Mattek-Sands

Diamond Aces
 Elina Svitolina

WTA Coach of the Year
 Darren Cahill
 Kamau Murray
 Wim Fissette
 Thomas Drouet
 Sascha Bajin

Fan Favourite Player
 Simona Halep
 Angelique Kerber
 Caroline Wozniacki
 Elina Svitolina
 Naomi Osaka
 Sloane Stephens
 Petra Kvitová
 Karolína Plíšková
 Kiki Bertens
 Daria Kasatkina
 Anastasija Sevastova
 Elise Mertens
 Aryna Sabalenka
 Julia Görges
 Ashleigh Barty
 Serena Williams
 Madison Keys
 Garbiñe Muguruza
 Caroline Garcia
 Wang Qiang
 Venus Williams
 Maria Sharapova
 Eugenie Bouchard
 Agnieszka Radwańska
 Jeļena Ostapenko
 Johanna Konta

Fan Favorite WTA Shot of the Year
 Agnieszka Radwańska, Auckland Open first round
 Simona Halep, Miami Open third round()
 Hsieh Su-wei, Japan Women's Open semifinals
 Ons Jabeur, Kremlin Cup final

Fan Favorite WTA Match of the Year
 Simona Halep vs  Sloane Stephens, Canadian Open final (7–6, 3–6, 6–4)()

Fan Favorite Grand Slam Match of the Year
 Simona Halep vs  Angelique Kerber, Australian Open semifinals (6–3, 4–6, 9–7)()

References

WTA Awards
WTA Awards